John Leydon (17 January 1895 – 2 August 1979) was an Irish civil servant, who served in a number of significant roles in ministerial departments and was involved in the setting up and development of a number of semi-state organisations such as Irish Shipping (first chairman), Aer Rianta (served as director and chairman), Aer Lingus (served as chairman), and the Institute of Public Administration (which he served as its first president).

Leydon was educated at St. Mel's College, Longford, before going to Maynooth College as a seminarian, he did not pursue the priesthood, and instead joined the British civil service in 1915. A devout Catholic, he was a member of the Legion of Mary a colleague in the civil service of its founder Frank Duff, and a close friend, Duff served as his best man.

Awards and honours
He was awarded by the Vatican the title Knight Commander with star of the Order of St. Gregory the Great in 1948.
Leydon was awarded an honorary doctorate from the University of Dublin in 1961.

Death
Leydon died on 2 August 1979, aged 84. He is buried in Deans Grange Cemetery Dublin.

References

1895 births
1979 deaths
Alumni of St Patrick's College, Maynooth
Irish civil servants
Burials at Deans Grange Cemetery
Knights Commander with Star of the Order of St. Gregory the Great
People educated at St Mel's College